Georgia Taylor (born Claire Jackson; 26 February 1980) is an English actress.  Her TV roles include Toyah Battersby in the ITV soap opera Coronation Street (1997–2003, 2016–present), Ruth Winters in the BBC One medical drama series Casualty (2007–2011), and Kate Barker in the ITV crime series Law & Order: UK (2013–2014).

Early life 
Taylor was born Claire Jackson on 26 February 1980 in Wigan, Greater Manchester. She attended the Willpower Youth Theatre in Wigan as a teenager.

Career 

In 1997, Taylor began playing Toyah Battersby in Coronation Street. In 2001, she won the Best Dramatic Performance British Soap Award for playing Toyah. She quit the show in 2003 and has since appeared in episodes of Where the Heart Is, New Street Law, Lilies, Red Cap, the BBC's The Afternoon Play series and Life on Mars.

In September 2016 it was announced that Taylor would return to Coronation Street as Toyah Battersby. She resumed her role in the episode aired on Christmas Day 2016.

In 2003, she appeared with Duncan Bannatyne in the Tyne Tees Television comedy pilot Girls' Club. In 2004 and 2006, Taylor played a recurring role in the Golden Globe award nominated series Blackpool and its follow up Viva Blackpool for BBC One.

In May 2005, Taylor appeared in  The Woman Before at the Royal Court opposite Helen Baxendale. In the same year, she received rave reviews for her role in Christmas is Miles Away at the Royal Exchange Theatre in Manchester.

In 2006, Taylor played Fiona in the film version of the transatlantic stage hit The History Boys. She appeared in an independent short film Soul Shutter in 2008, and also had a small role in the 2008 feature film The Bank Job. Her radio credits include Dakota of the White Flats by Phillip Ridley.

Taylor joined the cast of the BBC One medical drama Casualty as series regular Ruth Winters in September 2007.

She left Casualty in December 2011, along with co-star Ben Turner, who played her main love interest in the show.

In 2013 and 2014, Taylor played Junior Crown Prosecutor Kate Barker for two series (seasons) of Law & Order: UK.

Personal life 
In 2003 Taylor was in a relationship with musician Mark Eyden, and was planning marriage and children. As of 2013, she was living in Bristol with her partner, actor Mark Letheren, whom she met on the set of Casualty.

Filmography

Awards and nominations

References

External links 
 

1980 births
Living people
English soap opera actresses
English television actresses
English stage actresses
English film actresses
English radio actresses
People from Wigan
Actresses from Greater Manchester
20th-century English actresses
21st-century English actresses